Oier is a Basque given name. It may refer to:

 Oier Aizpurua, Spanish canoeist
 Oier Larraínzar, Spanish footballer
 Oier Olazábal, Spanish footballer
 Oier Sanjurjo, Spanish footballer
 Oier Zearra, Spanish pelota player

It may refer to:
 
 OiER - Organization for International Economic Relations